This is a list of results of leadership elections for the Ontario Liberal Party, a political party in Ontario, Canada.

Note: Before 1919, the leaders of the Ontario Liberal Party were chosen by its elected Members of the Legislative Assembly. There were calls for a more open process as early as 1907.

1919 leadership convention

(Held on June 26, 1919 at the Foresters' Hall, 22 College Street, Toronto.)

First ballot:

Hartley Dewart 147
J.C. Tolmie 97
J.C. Elliott 37
William Proudfoot 23
Thomas McMillan 8

Second ballot:

Hartley Dewart 158
J.C. Tolmie 121
J.C. Elliott 24

Charles Martin Bowman, MPP for Bruce North; W.T.R. Preston, editor of the Port Hope Evening Guide, Rev. W. G. Charlton of Aylmer, and A. J. Young of Toronto were nominated but declined. Frederick Forsyth Pardee, Member of Parliament for Lambton West was to be nominated but sent a message to the convention declining.

1922 leadership convention

(Held on March 3, 1922 at the Foresters' Hall, 22 College Street, Toronto.)

Wellington Hay won with clear majority on the first ballot
J.C. Tolmie
W.E.N. Sinclair

(Note:  The vote totals do not appear to have been announced.)

1930 leadership convention

(Held on December 16–17, 1930 at the King Edward Hotel in Toronto.)

Mitchell Hepburn 427
Elmore Philpott 97

W.E.N. Sinclair and Sydney Tweed both withdrew from the race before balloting.

1943 leadership convention

(Held on April 30, 1943 at the King Edward Hotel in Toronto.)

Harry Nixon 418
Arthur Roebuck 85
Thomas McQuesten 40
Walter Thomson 22
There were 8 spoiled ballots. 
Premier Gordon Conant had also been a candidate but collapsed the morning of the leadership vote and withdrew.

1945 leadership election

(Held on April 2, 1945 at the King Edward Hotel in Toronto.)

Mitchell Hepburn acclaimed

Harry Nixon resigned as Liberal leader on December 10, 1944 and nominated Hepburn to succeed him as parliamentary leader until a leadership convention could be held. Following the defeat of George Drew's Conservative government in a non-confidence motion, Hepburn was elected Acting Leader on April 2, 1945, at a joint meeting held at the King Edward Hotel of Ontario Liberal MPPs, federal Ontario Liberal MPs the party executive and other party officials in order to lead the party into the election. The move was to be affirmed by a party convention to be held on May 1, but this was cancelled due to the 1945 provincial election being underway.
Hepburn was defeated in the 1945 provincial election, and Farquhar Oliver was chosen as the Ontario Liberal Party's parliamentary leader on July 4, 1945.

1947 leadership convention

(Held on May 16, 1947 at the King Edward Hotel in Toronto)

Farquhar Oliver elected
Colin Campbell
Allan A. Lamport
Alvin P. Cadeau
W.A. Gunn
P.M. Dewan and W.A. Moore both withdrew from the race before balloting.

(Note:  Complete vote totals were not reported. Oliver received 492 of 661 votes cast)

1950 leadership convention

(Held on November 10, 1950 at the Royal York Hotel in Toronto.)

First ballot:

Walter Thomson 296
Harry Cassidy 156
John G. Brown 149
Campbell Calder 69
Henry Arnott Hicks 28
Charles Winnans Cox 24
Norman Hipel 12
J.J. Sullivan 4

Second ballot (Sullivan eliminated; Hicks, Cox and Hipel withdrew):

Walter Thomson 334
Harry Cassidy 194
John G. Brown 166
Campbell Calder 50

Third ballot (Calder eliminated):

Walter Thomson 365
Harry Cassidy 220
John G. Brown 116

1954 leadership convention

(Held on April 9, 1954 at the Royal York Hotel in Toronto.)

Farquhar Oliver 412
Albert Wren 162
Bob Temple 46

1958 leadership convention

(Held on April 20, 1958 at the King Edward Hotel in Toronto.)

First ballot:

Walter Harris 304
John Wintermeyer 264
Joe Greene 88
Vernon Singer 43
Ross Whicher 39
Arthur Reaume 32
Albert Wren 7

Wren eliminated and endorsed Wintermeyer; Whicher and Reaume withdrew and endorsed Wintermeyer.

Second ballot:

John Wintermeyer 369
Walter Harris 354
Joe Greene45
Vernon Singer 21

Singer eliminated.

Third ballot:

John Wintermeyer 398
Walter Harris 349
Joe Greene 14

1964 leadership convention

(Held on September 19–20, 1964 at the Royal York Hotel in Toronto.)

1967 leadership convention

(Held on January 6, 1967 at the Royal York Hotel, Toronto)

Robert Nixon  acclaimed

(Nixon was elected interim leader by the caucus on November 16, 1966 following the resignation of Andrew Thompson. Nixon had suggested that Charles Templeton may become permanent leader but members of his caucus spoke in opposition and Templeton decline to run. Nixon was acclaimed as permanent leader at the party's 1967 convention. He announced his resignation as party leader in 1972, but subsequently entered the race to succeed himself in 1973.)

1973 leadership convention

(Held on October 28, 1973 at the Royal York Hotel in Toronto.)

1976 leadership convention

(Held on January 24–25, 1976 at the Four Seasons Sheraton Hotel, Toronto)

1982 leadership convention

(Held on February 21, 1982 at the Sheraton Centre Toronto Hotel, Toronto).

 = Eliminated from next round
 = Withdrew nomination
 = Winner

1992 leadership convention

(Held February 8–9, 1992 at the Copps Coliseum in Hamilton.)

 = Eliminated from next round
 = Withdrew nomination
 = Winner

There were 21 spoiled ballots on the final count, mostly from die-hard supporters of Sorbara.

1996 leadership convention

(Held November 30 – December 1, 1996 at the Maple Leaf Gardens, Toronto)

2013 leadership election

(Held January 26, 2013 at the Maple Leaf Gardens, Toronto)

 = Eliminated from next round
 = Withdrew nomination
 = Winner

Takhar endorsed Pupatello before the second ballot voting took place, but after the deadline to drop off the ballot.

2020 leadership election

(Held March 6–7, 2020 at the International Centre, Mississauga)

Next leadership election

A leadership election is currently pending due to the June 2, 2022 resignation of Steven Del Duca as party leader following his party's poor result in the 2022 Ontario general election.

References